The women's artistic team all-around gymnastics competition at the 2022 Commonwealth Games in Birmingham, England was held on 30 July 2022 at Arena Birmingham.

This event also determined the qualification standings for the individual all-around and apparatus finals.

Schedule 
The schedule was as follows:

All times are British Summer Time (UTC+1)

Results

Team competition
The initial field for the women's team event was published on 20 July 2022. The minimum entry to compete in the team event is three gymnasts, the maximum allowed is five gymnasts. India (three) and Scotland and Sri Lanka (four) are the only teams entered without maximum numbers. The top three scores on each apparatus count to the team total. The results are as follows:

Qualification results

Individual all-around

The results are as follows:

Vault

The results are as follows:

Uneven bars

The results are as follows:

Balance beam

The results are as follows:

Floor

The results are as follows:

References

Women's